Marcos Luis Pérez Trujillo (born 30 September 1989), sometimes known as just Marcos, is a Spanish footballer who plays for Lincoln Red Imps as a defender.

Club career
Born in Lucena, Córdoba, Andalusia, Marcos finished his graduation with Córdoba CF, and made his senior debuts with the reserves in the Tercera División in the 2006–07 season. In the summer of 2008 he was loaned to Antequera CF of the Segunda División B, and joined fellow third-tier club Écija Balompié, also on loan, for the following campaign.

On 15 July 2010 Marcos signed with Villarreal CF B of the Segunda División. However, after being demoted to the C-team, he terminated his contract and joined CA Osasuna B. He made his debut for CA Osasuna's first team and first appearance in La Liga on 6 November 2011, playing the last 31 minutes in a 1–7 away loss against Real Madrid.

On 27 June 2013 Marcos moved to his hometown, agreeing to a deal with Lucena CF of the Segunda B. The following March he terminated his contract and moved to another third-tier team, La Hoya Lorca CF.

References

External links
 
 
 

1989 births
Living people
Spanish footballers
Footballers from Andalusia
Association football defenders
La Liga players
Segunda División B players
Tercera División players
Gibraltar Premier Division players
Córdoba CF B players
Córdoba CF players
Antequera CF footballers
Écija Balompié players
CA Osasuna B players
CA Osasuna players
Lucena CF players
Lorca FC players
Lincoln Red Imps F.C. players